Send 'em Back Half Dead is a 1933 comedy film directed by Redd Davis and starring Nelson Keys, Polly Luce and Ben Welden. It is intended as a parody of the American film Bring 'Em Back Alive, released the previous year.

It was made at Blattner Studios, Elstree, as a quota quickie for distribution by Fox Film.

Cast
 Nelson Keys as Hank Ruck 
 Polly Luce as Marie Ruck 
 Ben Welden as Mustapha 
 Kenneth Kove as Roland Peabody 
 Andreas Malandrinos as Tony 
 Jack Harris

References

Bibliography
 Chibnall, Steve. Quota Quickies: The British of the British 'B' Film. British Film Institute, 2007.
 Low, Rachael. Filmmaking in 1930s Britain. George Allen & Unwin, 1985.
 Wood, Linda. British Films, 1927-1939. British Film Institute, 1986.

External links

1933 films
British comedy films
British black-and-white films
1933 comedy films
Films directed by Redd Davis
Films shot at Rock Studios
Quota quickies
Fox Film films
1930s English-language films
1930s American films
1930s British films